Scientific plagiarism in Germany became widely discussed when Ph.D. dissertations of notable candidates, including several cabinet members, were scrutinized and found to contain plagiates.

List

See also 
 Scientific misconduct

References 

Scientific misconduct
Plagiarism in science
Science and technology in Germany